John Lithgow is an American actor, musician, singer, comedian and author.

He has received two Tony Awards, six Emmy Awards, two Golden Globe Awards, three Screen Actors Guild Awards, an American Comedy Award, four Drama Desk Awards and has also been nominated for two Academy Awards and four Grammy Awards. Lithgow has received a star on the Hollywood Walk of Fame and has been inducted into the American Theater Hall of Fame.

Major associations

Academy Awards
The Academy Awards (Oscars) are presented by the Academy of Motion Picture Arts and Sciences (AMPAS)

Tony Awards
The Tony Award is presented by the American Theatre Wing and The Broadway League. Considered the highest honor in US theatre.

Primetime Emmy Awards
6 wins out of 12 nominations
The Primetime Emmy Awards are presented by the American Academy of Television Arts & Sciences.

Grammy Awards
The Grammy Awards are presented by the American National Academy of Recording Arts and Sciences.

Theatre awards

Drama Desk Awards

Outer Critics Circle

Industry Awards

Golden Globes Awards

Screen Actors Guild Awards

British Academy Television Awards

Critics Awards

Critics' Choice Television Awards

New York Film Critics Circle

Los Angeles Film Critics Association

People's Choice Awards

Other awards

AACTA Award

Walk of Fame

Satellite Awards

Saturn Awards

Other awards
2017:  Harvard Arts Medal

References

External links
 John Lithgow at FEARnet
 Profile of John Lithgow – Downstage Center
 2006 bio article on Lithgow
 Razor and Tie Artist Page
 Razor and Tie Media Page
 TonyAwards.com Interview with John Lithgow
 John Lithgow speaks at the Oxonian Society November 15, 2007
 NYPL gallery of selected stage production photographs, 1967-1988

Lithgow
Awards